Ewan Campbell Kennedy Douglas (14 November 1922 – 29 December 1999) was a British athlete. He competed in the men's hammer throw at the 1948 Summer Olympics and the 1952 Summer Olympics.

References

1922 births
1999 deaths
Athletes (track and field) at the 1948 Summer Olympics
Athletes (track and field) at the 1952 Summer Olympics
British male hammer throwers
Scottish male hammer throwers
Olympic athletes of Great Britain
Place of birth missing
Commonwealth Games medallists in athletics
Commonwealth Games bronze medallists for Scotland
Athletes (track and field) at the 1954 British Empire and Commonwealth Games
Athletes (track and field) at the 1958 British Empire and Commonwealth Games
Medallists at the 1954 British Empire and Commonwealth Games